The Pakistan Society of Neuro-Oncology (PASNO) is Pakistan's first scientific society dedicated to neuro-oncology. It was created to bring together experts from within and outside Pakistan to improve the care of patients with tumors of the brain and spinal cord, and provide a platform for research, teaching and training activities related to neuro-oncology in Pakistan. PASNO is chartered by the Government of Pakistan and is a non-profit society.
 
The society's inaugural symposium was attended by over 50 speakers from 13 countries.

References

External links

Journal of Neuro-Oncology

Neurology
Neurosurgery
Oncology